Street Gang: How We Got to Sesame Street is a 2021 American documentary film directed by Marilyn Agrelo. Inspired by the book Street Gang by Michael Davis, the film chronicles the history of the children's television program Sesame Street and the artists, writers, producers, and educators who created it.

The film premiered at the 2021 Sundance Film Festival, was released in theatres on April 23, 2021, and released on video-on-demand services on May 7, 2021. HBO released the documentary on December 13, 2021.

Release
In November 2018, Focus Features acquired distribution rights to the film, with HBO Documentary Films producing and acquiring streaming and broadcast rights. In December 2020, Screen Media Films acquired distribution rights to the film, with Focus no longer attached to distribute, and HBO still attached. It had its world premiere at the Sundance Film Festival on January 30, 2021. It was released in a limited release on April 23, 2021, followed by video on demand on May 7, 2021.

Reception
On the review aggregator website Rotten Tomatoes, the film has an approval rating of 95%, based on 88 reviews, with an average rating of 8.10/10. The site's critics consensus reads: "Like the show whose groundbreaking creation it commemorates, Street Gang: How We Got to Sesame Street is as enlightening as it is purely entertaining." According to Metacritic, which assigned a weighted average score of 82 out of 100, based on 14 critics, the film received "universal acclaim".

Varietys Chris Willman, in his review of the film, wrote that "It's hard to ask for much more than a doc that captures creatives thoughtfully sneaking the civil revolution as well as basic education into children's TV and includes a Muppets blooper reel." Daniel Fienberg of The Hollywood Reporter also gave the film a mostly positive review, concluding: "If 107 minutes is maybe insufficient for something as important and layered as Sesame Street, that likely won't keep viewers from being satisfied. They'll just have to make a few more documentaries about this seminal show."

Josh Flanders of the Chicago Reader called the film "A nostalgic yet informative look at the most successful children's television show in history." IndieWire's Kate Erbland gave the film a grade of "B+", writing: "Street Gang may lightly gloss over some of the tougher elements of its genesis and legacy, but the staggering amount of material on offer makes the case that a good heart was always meant to be the best part of the show." Brian Tallerico of RogerEbert.com referred to the film as "remarkably likable" but lamented its "scattered, quick structure", calling it "an enjoyable documentary, but it's also shallow when one considers all of the stories told in it that barely get a few minutes of screen time".

References

External links
 
 

2021 films
2021 documentary films
American documentary films
Sesame Street
Documentary films about television
HBO documentary films
Films directed by Marilyn Agrelo
2020s English-language films
2020s American films